The Milton Godard House is a historic building located southwest of Maquoketa, Iowa, United States. This house is considered an excellent example of limestone craftsmanship and design. It is one of over 217 limestone structures in Jackson County from the mid-19th century, of which 101 are houses. Very few are in this part of the county, and most are vernacular construction. The Godard house has elements on the Gothic Revival style, especially in the fenestrations. It is also unusual in that it is two different houses built at two different times. Local tradition says that five stonemasons from Germany were brought here to work on the house, and they stayed here for eight years until it was completed. Godard was a Connecticut native who settled here in 1845. He donated land to the east of his house in the 1880s for a Methodist church. The church was razed in 1926, but the cemetery remains. The house was listed on the National Register of Historic Places in 1992.

References

Houses completed in 1866
Gothic Revival architecture in Iowa
Houses in Jackson County, Iowa
National Register of Historic Places in Jackson County, Iowa
Houses on the National Register of Historic Places in Iowa